Jahmali Waite (born 24 December 1998) is a Jamaican professional footballer who plays as a goalkeeper for the Pittsburgh Riverhounds in the USL Championship.

Career

Youth
Waite played as part of the Philadelphia Union academy, also appearing on the bench for the club's USL Championship side during their 2017 season. He was persuaded to move to the club by fellow Jamaican Andre Blake.

College & Amateur
In 2017, Waite attended Fairleigh Dickinson University to play college soccer. In three seasons with the Knights, Waite made 40 appearances. He was named to the Northeast Conference All-Rookie team as a freshman in 2017 and a First Team All-NEC selection in 2018. In his final year with the Knights, he was named the NEC Tournament MVP and helped guide Fairleigh Dickinson to the 2019 NCAA Tournament.

2020 saw Waite transfer to the University of Connecticut, where he made a further 23 appearances.

During his time at college, Waite also played in the USL League Two. He made eight regular season appearances and one playoff appearance for Reading United AC during their 2019 season. In 2021, Waite appeared for Ocean City Nor'easters, playing nine times in the league and twice in the playoffs.

Following college, Waite went undrafted in the 2022 MLS SuperDraft, but joined Major League Soccer club Chicago Fire for their preseason training camp. However, he did not sign for the club.

Professional
On 25 March 2022, Waite signed his first professional contract, joining USL Championship club Pittsburgh Riverhounds. He made his debut for the club in the Lamar Hunt U.S. Open Cup on 5 April 2022.

International
Waite has represented Jamaica at under-17 level. Waite made his senior international debut on November 10th versus Cameroon.

References

External links
JAHMALI WAITE Pittsburgh Riverhounds Profile

1998 births
Living people
Association football goalkeepers
Philadelphia Union II players
Expatriate soccer players in the United States
Fairleigh Dickinson Knights men's soccer players
Jamaican expatriate footballers
Jamaican expatriate sportspeople in the United States
Jamaican footballers
Ocean City Nor'easters players
Pittsburgh Riverhounds SC players
Reading United A.C. players
UConn Huskies men's soccer players
USL Championship players
USL League Two players